Louis Cuny (24 November 1902 – 24 July 1962) was a French film director, screenwriter, film producer, production designer, and film editor.

Filmography 

 1936 : La Voie triomphale (SF)	
 1936 : Le Lycée Papillon (SF)
 1938 : Le Violon (SF)
 1939 : Au jardin de la France (SF)
 1942 : Matin de France (SF)
 1943 : Hommage à Georges Bizet (SF)
 1943 : L’Arlésienne (SF)  		
 1943 : La Musique à travers les âges (SF)	
 1943 : Mermoz
 1945 : Rouen, martyre d'une cité (SF)
 1945 : Croisière extra muros (SF)	
 1945 : Panorama musical (SF)	
 1946 : Maman de secours (SF)		
 1946 : Strange Fate
 1947 : Si j'avais la chance (SF)
 1947 : The Woman in Red
 1947 : Le Beau Voyage
 1949 : Il faut qu'une porte soit ouverte ou fermée (SF)
 1949 : Tous les deux
 1951 : Demain nous divorçons
 1952 : Plume au vent
 1957 : Bonjour Toubib
 1958 : Gentleman cambrioleur, best short film at San Sebastián International Film Festival in 1958
 1959 : Symphonie pour un homme seul (SF)
 1959 : Les Amoureux de la Seine (SF)
 1959 : Ciné ballets de Paris (Documentary film)		
 1961 : Magic Coiffeur (SF)

References

External links 

Louis Cuny sur Film Database
17 films liés à Louis Cuny on Ciné-Ressources
 Luis Cuny on 

French film directors
French film editors
French film producers
French production designers
People from Montreuil, Seine-Saint-Denis
1902 births
1962 deaths